The Unabomber (born 1942) is an American domestic terrorist.

Unabomber may also refer to:
 Unabomber (album)
 Phil Laak or the Unabomber (born 1972), Irish poker player

See also 
 Italian Unabomber (fl. 1990s), unidentified Italian bomber
 Glenn Jacobs (born 1967), professional wrestler who worked under the ring name "Unabomb"
 Manhunt: Unabomber, a 2017 television miniseries
 Unabomber for President, a 1996 political campaign